Live From Austin, TX is the second live album by American rock band Drive-By Truckers.  It was released as a two disc CD/DVD combo.  It was recorded on September 26, 2008, and boasts an almost twelve-minute recording of the song "18 Wheels of Love," which was originally released on their first album Gangstabilly.

Guitarist Patterson Hood stated the album and DVD are: "by far our best filmed performance."

Track listing
"Perfect Timing" (Cooley)
"Heathens" (Hood)
"A Ghost To Most" (Cooley)
"The Righteous Path" (Hood)
"I'm Sorry Huston" (Tucker)
"3 Dimes Down" (Cooley)
"Puttin' People On The Moon" (Hood)
"Space City" (Cooley)
"The Living Bubba" (Hood)
"Zip City" (Cooley)
"18 Wheels Of Love" (Hood)
"Let There Be Rock" (Hood)
"Marry Me" (Cooley)

Personnel
Patterson Hood - guitar, vocals
Mike Cooley - guitar, vocals
Brad Morgan - drums
Shonna Tucker - bass, vocals
John Neff - guitar, pedal steel
Jay Gonzalez - keyboards

Charts

References

Drive-By Truckers albums
2009 live albums
New West Records live albums
2009 video albums
Live video albums
New West Records video albums